Kurniawan Karman (born 29 March 1991) is an Indonesian professional footballer who plays for Liga 1 club RANS Nusantara. Mainly a full-back, he can also operate as a central midfielder or right midfielder.

Club career
He played for Pro Duta before moving in 2012 to PSM Makassar.

International career
He had played for several youth national team levels. Karman called up to Indonesia under-21 team and played in 2012 Hassanal Bolkiah Trophy, but failed to win after losing 0-2 from Brunei under-21 team.

Honours

Club
Persebaya Surabaya
 Liga 2: 2017
RANS Cilegon
 Liga 2 runner-up: 2021

International
Indonesia U-21
Hassanal Bolkiah Trophy runner-up: 2012

References

External links
 

1991 births
Badak Lampung F.C. players
Persebaya Surabaya players
Pro Duta FC players
Persiba Balikpapan players
Indonesian footballers
PSM Makassar players
PS Barito Putera players
RANS Nusantara F.C. players
Liga 1 (Indonesia) players
Liga 2 (Indonesia) players
Association football midfielders
Living people
Sportspeople from Makassar
People from Makassar
Sportspeople from South Sulawesi
20th-century Indonesian people
21st-century Indonesian people